Mohamed Brahimi may refer to:
 Mohamed Brahimi (footballer, born 1970)
 Mohamed Brahimi (footballer, born 1998)